Sepak Takraw at the 2009 Southeast Asian Games was held at the LAO International Trade Exhibition and Convention Centre - ITECC Hall 1 in Vientiane, Laos

Medal summary

Medalists

Men

Women

External links
 SEA Games 2009 Official Report

2009 Southeast Asian Games events
2009